World Porridge Day, on 10 October, is an international event related to porridge. The first of the days was held in 2009. The event is organized to raise funds for the charity Mary's Meals, based in Argyll, Scotland, to aid starving children in developing countries. The organization "feeds the nutrient-rich maize-based porridge Likuni Phala to about 320,000 children in Malawi each year." The 2009 day included gatherings in the United States, France, Malawi, Bosnia and Sweden.

Stoats Porridge Bars was the official World Porridge Day partner in 2016.

The World Porridge Making Championship has taken place alongside the day since 2009.

References 

Children's charities based in Scotland
Porridges
October observances
International observances
Observances about food and drink